Kurt Doss (born September 18, 1996) is an American child actor, best known for playing Frred in Happy Monster Band, and playing the youngest son, Ben Gallagher in Ruby & the Rockits.

Biography
Doss's home town is Erie, Pennsylvania. From a young age had a sense of humor, which got the attention of Chambers Stevens, who is an acting coach. Doss was introduced to acting by Stevens, and Doss and his mother decided to move to Los Angeles, CA so Doss could pursue acting.

Career
In a six-year period, Doss appeared in 40 national commercials for Kellogg's, Sarah Lee, Washington Mutual, Fruit of the Loom, and others.

He made his acting debut in television, playing Tori Spelling's nephew in the TV movie, A Christmas Carol. Soon-after, Kurt had co-starring and guest starring roles in television such as According to Jim, Joey, Desperate Housewives, Back To You The New Adventures of Old Christine, Scrubs and more. He was a lead series regular in the children's program Happy Monster Band, plus he had a recurring role in Special Agent Oso. Doss also has appeared in sketch comedy and improv, such as The Tonight Show with Jay Leno, MAD TV and Frank TV. He then landed a starring role in Ruby & the Rockits, playing the youngest son, Ben. His first leading role in a feature film was Henry in Knucklehead.

Filmography

References

External links

Male actors from Pennsylvania
American male child actors
American male film actors
American male television actors
Living people
Actors from Erie, Pennsylvania
1996 births